Petrobrazi Refinery  is one of the largest Romanian refineries and one of the largest in Eastern Europe, located in Ploieşti, Prahova County having as a main activity the processing of Romanian oil but also has a separate unit specialised in processing chemical products. The refinery had two processing modules with a nominal capacity of 3.5 million tonnes/year each and a total capacity of 7 million tonnes/year. The facility is connected by pipeline to virtually all of the oil fields in Romania by an extensive pipe network and to the Port of Constanţa by a pipeline with a capacity of 10,000 tonnes/day.

History
Petrobrazi was founded in 1934 in a strategic industrial zone of  located in Southern Romania near Ploieşti. The first oil processing capacity was established in 1934 and had a processing capacity of 300,000 tonnes/year. In 1962 Petrobrazi becomes the first modern refinery in Romania with the addition of the catalytic cracking and reforming processes. In 1965 the refinery was integrated with the Petrochemical Complex. In 1997 the state established Petrom as the national oil company also including the Petrobrazi Refinery. In 2003 the refinery becomes the first facility of its kind in Romania that has its own cogeneration power plant. With its nominal processing capacity of 7 million tonnes/year, Petrobrazi is the largest Romanian refinery. It is also the most efficient refinery in Romania having a Nelson complexity index of 11.4.

References

External links

Oil and gas companies of Romania
Oil refineries in Romania
Companies based in Ploiești